The Togo national football team (French: Équipe nationale de football du Togo) represents Togo in international football and is controlled by the Togolese Football Federation. The national football team of Togo made their debut in the FIFA World Cup in 2006. Their team bus underwent a fatal attack in Angola prior to the 2010 Africa Cup of Nations. They withdrew and were subsequently banned from the following two tournaments by the Confederation of African Football (CAF). In 2013 for the first time in history, Togo reached the quarter-finals of the Africa Cup of Nations. The team represents both FIFA and Confederation of African Football (CAF).

History
They made their first FIFA World Cup appearance in their history in 2006, having been coached throughout the qualifying campaign by Stephen Keshi; German coach Otto Pfister managed the team at the finals, despite having resigned three days before their first match over a players' bonuses dispute, only to be persuaded by the players to return. Prior to gaining independence in 1960, the team were known as French Togoland.

2006 World Cup
Togo lost their opening game of the World Cup, despite having taken the lead against South Korea through a goal by Mohamed Kader. In the second half, Jean-Paul Abalo was sent off after 55 minutes, and goals from Lee Chun-Soo and Ahn Jung-Hwan sealed a 2–1 defeat for Togo.

Togo's next opponents in Group G were Switzerland, with the match scheduled for the afternoon of 19 June. However, the Togo squad and manager Pfister threatened to refuse to fulfill the fixture and take strike action. The squad and manager had been quoted as requesting payments from the Togolese Football Federation for participating in the tournament of around €155,000 (US$192,000) with added bonuses for victories or draws. FIFA negotiated with the squad and manager on 17 June, persuading them to travel to Dortmund in time to fulfill the fixture; goals from Alexander Frei and Tranquillo Barnetta resulted in a 2–0 defeat. FIFA subsequently imposed a CHF100,000 fine on the Togolese federation for "behaviour unworthy of a participant in the World Cup."

Togo's final group game against France ended in 2–0 defeat.

Sierra Leone air disaster

After a 2008 African Nations Cup qualifier away to Sierra Leone on 3 June 2007, 20 members of a delegation of sports officials from Togo, including Togolese Sports Minister Richard Attipoe, were killed when their helicopter exploded and crashed at Lungi International Airport. No players of the Togo national team were among the victims. The Togo players and officials of the team had been waiting to take the next helicopter flight to the island on which the airport is located.

2010 bus ambush and ban

On 8 January 2010, the Togo team bus was attacked by gunmen as it travelled to the 2010 Africa Cup of Nations tournament, killing three and injuring several others. The separatist group Front for the Liberation of the Enclave of Cabinda (FLEC) claimed responsibility for the attack. Goalkeeper Kodjovi Obilale was reported dead a day after the attack. Such reports were later dismissed by his club GSI Pontivy in a press announcement, stating the player was actually undergoing surgery in South Africa.

Following the bus ambush attack, the Togolese Football Federation stated that they would withdraw from the 2010 Africa Cup of Nations; despite claims that the team had since reversed the decision and would compete "to show our national colours, our values and that we are men" (as announced by Thomas Dossevi), the government later ordered that the team return home.

Following the team's withdrawal, The Confederation of African Football (CAF) banned Togo from participating in the next two editions of the Cup of Nations and fined them US$50,000 because of the "decision taken by the political authorities". The CAF executive Committee considered that the Togolese team was in "forfeit notified less than twenty days before the start or during the final competition" (Art. 78 of the Regulations for the Africa Cup of Nations), rather than having withdrawn (Art. 80), and refused to consider the circumstances as force majeure (Art. 87). Togo's government immediately said they would sue as CAF "have no consideration for the lives of other human beings" and this is further "insulting to the family of those who lost their lives and those traumatized because of the attack". FIFA has yet to comment on the issue. Togo footballer Thomas Dossevi said "We are a group of footballers who came under fire and now we can't play football any more. They are crushing us". Togolese captain Emmanuel Adebayor described the decision as "outrageous" and said that CAF President Issa Hayatou had "completely betrayed" the Togo squad.

As a result of the events, Emmanuel Adebayor announced his retirement from international football on 12 April 2010. But on 22 March 2011 Adebayor announced that he was again available for the national team.

Fake Togo Team
On 7 September 2010, Togo allegedly played Bahrain in a friendly losing the match 3–0. However, on 14 September, the Togo FA claimed that a fake team had played against Bahrain. Togo's Sport Minister Christophe Tchao said to the Jeune Afrique magazine that nobody in Togo had "ever been informed of such a game". On 20 September 2010, it was revealed that former Togo manager Bana Tchanilé was the culprit and the Togo FA have given him a three-year ban in addition to the two-year ban he got in July 2010 for taking Togo players to play a tournament in Egypt. The match fixing has been linked to Wilson Raj Perumal and the Singaporean match-fixing syndicate allegedly run by Tan Seet Eng.

2014 World Cup Qualification
Togo began qualification for the 2014 World Cup on November 11, 2011, against Guinea-Bissau. They drew in the first leg 1–1. On November 15, 2011, they won the return leg 1–0. On June 3, 2012, they played Libya in Lome and drew 1–1. Shortly after on June 10, they played Congo DR at Kinshasa and lost 2–0. They resumed on March 3, 2013, and played Cameroon in Yaounde and lost 2–1. They met again on June 9 in Lome and Togo won 2–0. In the end, Togo failed to qualify for the 2014 World Cup in Brazil.

Results and fixtures

2021

2022

2023

Coaches
Caretaker managers are listed in italics.

 Jean Robin (1965)
 Gottlieb Göller (1970–1974)
 Gottlieb Göller (1984)
 Boško Antić (1987–1989)
 Julien Dovi Aguiar (1992)
 Baboima Ergot (1993)
 Gottlieb Göller (1996–1997)
 Paul Messan Zougbédé (1997)
 Eberhard Vogel (1997–1998)
 Gottlieb Göller (1998–2000)
 Kodjovi Mawuéna (2000)
 Bana Tchanile (2000–2002)
 Diego Garzitto (2002)
 Antônio Dumas (2002–2004)
 Stephen Keshi (2004–2006)
 Otto Pfister (2006)
 Stephen Keshi (2007–2008)
 Henri Stambouli (2008)
 Kodjovi Mawuéna (2008–2009)
 Jean Thissen (2009)
 Hubert Velud (2009–2010)
 Thierry Froger (2010–2011)
 Stephen Keshi (2011)
 Didier Six (2011–2014)
 Tchakala Tchanilé (2014)
 Tom Saintfiet (2015–2016)
 Claude Le Roy (2016–2021)
 Jonas Komla (2021)
 Paulo Duarte (2021–present)

Players

Current squad
 The following players were called up for the 2023 Africa Cup of Nations qualification matches.
 Match dates: 24 and 28 March 2023
 Opposition: 
 Caps and goals correct as of:' 27 September 2022, after the match against .

Recent call-ups
The following players have been called up for Togo in the last 12 months.

DEC Player refused to join the team after the call-up.
INJ Player withdrew from the squad due to an injury.
PRE Preliminary squad.
RET Player has retired from international football.
SUS Suspended from the national team.

RecordsPlayers in bold are still active with Togo.''

Most appearances

Top goalscorers

Competition records

FIFA World Cup

Africa Cup of Nations

African Nations Championship

African Games

References

External links

Togo FA official site
Togo national football team picture

 
African national association football teams